Mała Wieś  is a village in Płock County, Masovian Voivodeship, in east-central Poland. It is the seat of the gmina (administrative district) called Gmina Mała Wieś.

The village has a population of 1,200.

References

Villages in Płock County